Shang Tsung is a fictional character in the Mortal Kombat fighting game franchise by Midway Games and NetherRealm Studios. He debuted as the final boss of the original 1992 game and has remained one of the franchise's primary villains. A powerful sorcerer, he is principally defined by his abilities to shapeshift into other characters and to absorb the souls of defeated warriors. Shang Tsung is usually portrayed as the right-hand man of Outworld emperor Shao Kahn and the archenemy of Shaolin monk Liu Kang. He also appeared as the main villain of Mortal Kombat: Deadly Alliance (2002), alongside Quan Chi as the eponymous Deadly Alliance, and Mortal Kombat 11: Aftermath (2020).

The character has appeared in various media outside of the games, including as the main villain of the 1995 film adaptation and the 2021 film. He has received a positive reception for his design, abilities, and role in the series.

Appearances

Mortal Kombat games
According to the first Mortal Kombat comic, Shang Tsung was cursed by his gods to steal souls lest he age rapidly and die prematurely. However, stealing souls allowed him to absorb his victims' knowledge and fighting skills as well. He entered the Mortal Kombat tournament, overcoming all competition and becoming the Grand Champion. After his victory, he became the tournament's coordinator, unfairly tipping the scales in Outworld's favor for nine tournaments so that Shao Kahn could conquer Earth. However, he and his protege and champion Goro are defeated by the Shaolin Monk Liu Kang in the tenth tournament during the events of the first Mortal Kombat game.

In Mortal Kombat II, Shao Kahn restores Shang Tsung's youth and tries to lure Earth's warriors into Outworld to give himself an advantage. While Shang Tsung and his master are defeated, this plot is merely a distraction while Shang Tsung resurrects Shao Kahn's wife Sindel in Earthrealm. Shao Kahn crosses the dimensional boundaries to claim her, which merges Earthrealm with Outworld and enslaves the souls of billions of people. Shang Tsung is assigned to hunt down survivors, but is defeated by Liu Kang once more.

In Mortal Kombat: Deadly Alliance, Shang Tsung joins forces with fellow sorcerer Quan Chi in a bid to conquer the realms by resurrecting Onaga the Dragon King's undead army. However, their plan goes awry when Onaga himself returns from the dead, reclaiming his army. When Raiden releases his godly essence in a last-ditch effort to defeat the Dragon King, Shang Tsung dies as well, but he is revived in Mortal Kombat Armageddon before the final battle between good and evil.

Shang Tsung appears as a playable character in the Mortal Kombat reboot game (2011), which serves as a reboot of the first three titles in the series. In this new timeline, his role is mostly consistent with these games. However, near the story's end, Shao Kahn steals Shang Tsung's soul and uses it to empower Sindel before sending her to kill the Earthrealm defenders.

While Shang Tsung was not included in Mortal Kombat X (2015), he does appear in Ermac's arcade ending, stealing the latter's souls to reconstitute himself, and in a flashback during Erron Black's ending that sees him slowing Black's aging process in exchange for him assassinating an Earthrealm warrior.

Shang Tsung returns in Mortal Kombat 11 as both a DLC character and the central character of the DLC story expansion Aftermath. In the game's story mode, his now abandoned island is the site of several battles as opposing factions fight over the countless souls that he has stored there. It is also revealed that Kronika, the game's antagonist, had long been supporting his efforts to accumulate souls so that she could use them as a power source in the event she needed to restart time. Shang Tsung also appears as the guardian of the Krypt, also based on his island, narrating the player's progress. In his non-canonical arcade ending, Shang Tsung used his knowledge of the dark arts to seize control of Kronika's power and steal souls from infinite timelines. To ensure his survival, he manipulated the Titans to scour the realms for more souls. In Aftermath, Kronika imprisoned Shang Tsung in the Void once his purpose was served, during which he formulated a plan to get revenge. Following her death, the sorcerer emerged alongside Fujin and Nightwolf to stop Fire God Liu Kang from using Kronika's hourglass without the Crown of Souls. As Liu Kang had destroyed his version, Shang Tsung convinced the Fire God to send him, Fujin, and Nightwolf back in time to retrieve a past version of the Crown. While in the past, the sorcerer orchestrates events to ensure that he could gain the Crown with little to no opposition from Earthrealm, Outworld, and Kronika's forces. Once they are all defeated, Shang Tsung attempts to restart history for himself, only to discover that Liu Kang had manipulated events to ensure the sorcerer's victory over Kronika. The Fire God demands he turn over the Crown, but Shang Tsung refuses, resulting in a final battle between the two warriors. In the bad ending, Shang Tsung defeats Liu Kang and absorbs his godly power to conquer all of the realms. In the good ending, he is defeated by Liu Kang, who erases the sorcerer from existence.

Character design and gameplay
 
Shang Tsung (originally named "Shang Lao") was based on a "Chinese sorcerer" archetype from martial arts films, including but not limited to the character Lo Pan from the film Big Trouble in Little China. He was originally envisioned as the one who would behead the losing fighter, prior to the concept of character-specific Shang Fatalities. (Daniel Pesina remembers playing with Shang Tsung's "plastic katana" and the sword-swinging animation might even be buried within the game files.) A cut character named "Kitsune", which was later developed into Kitana, "was going to fit into the story as Shang Lao’s (Tsung's) princess daughter - the spoil of victory for winning the tournament", who would betray her father after she fell for Liu Kang. The original idea was that Shang Tsung was a human traitor who had sold his soul. Mortal Kombat art director Herman Sanchez said that as the series progressed he decided to emphasize Tsung's air of "sinister regality."

Shang Tsung's design varies throughout the series. The initial history of the character was explained in the 1992 Midway-produced comic book based on the original MK game, in which he was the first-ever Mortal Kombat (then the Shaolin Tournament) champion over 500 years ago from the date of the then-current tournament depicted in the actual game, yet he was stricken with a curse that forced him to consume the souls of his defeated opponents in order to keep his youth. The book cited his "failure to appease the gods" as the reason for his premature aging to a withered old man, but he was noticeably younger in Mortal Kombat II, in which Shao Kahn had restored Shang Tsung's youth and powers as part of his plan to take over Earthrealm by luring Liu Kang and his fellow Earth warriors into Outworld for the next MK tournament. His actor in the sequel changed to Phillip Ahn, turning from the original game's Ho-Sung Pak.

According to GamePro magazine in 1993, the MKII version of Shang Tsung was nineteen years old, and an article about the game also included a rough sketch by Mortal Kombat co-creator John Tobias of Tsung's "true form," a twisted demon, which has never actually appeared in the video games. Tobias wanted Shang Tsung's long hair to hang loose in Mortal Kombat 3 (in which his actor was John Turk), but potential problems with it flopping about whenever he jumped resulted in it being tied back into a ponytail. Responding to player queries about how Shang Tsung's last name is pronounced, Acclaim Entertainment stated in 1994 that there is no one definitively correct way of pronouncing the character's name.

In the original Mortal Kombat game Shang Tsung is a computer-controlled boss that fires flaming skull projectiles and can morph into other characters at will; this gives him access to all of the Kombatants' signature moves. The character was originally given the morphing ability due to technical limitations as the arcade machines for the game had no memory left for his images. As a player character, he retains his morphing ability, but can only transform into player characters. His skull projectile's versatility is also expanded: he can summon skulls from above or below the opponent as well as shoot multiple skulls from his hands. Tsung's shapeshifting went mostly unused in Deadly Alliance, Deception, Armageddon, and Mortal Kombat vs. DC Universe. Ed Boon explained this was due to a lack of sufficient memory. It returns in the 2011 game, but its use is more limited; a player-controlled Shang Tsung can only morph into his current opponent. In Mortal Kombat 11, aside from morphing into the current opponent, Shang Tsung can also morph into several ninja characters (Ermac, Rain, Reptile, and Smoke) performing special moves as his variation abilities. He also references his original name, Shang Lao, in intro dialogue against himself.

Other media
Shang Tsung plays his original role of the main antagonist in the first series of the Malibu Comics' Blood & Thunder miniseries, with his backstory mostly unchanged as an old man serving Shao Kahn to open the portal through 10 consecutive Mortal Kombat wins. He and Raiden share a bitter relationship, usually ending in either verbal assaults or draw fights. While Shang Tsung hosted the tenth tournament, he secretly planned to gain the powers of the mystical book Tao Te Zhan, which granted immense strength to whoever resolves its seven riddles. Shang Tsung and Raiden later join forces to stop Goro after he took the power of the book, since he cannot be trusted with such strength. During the Battlewave miniseries, it is implied that Shang Tsung resumed the tournament after his plans were foiled and lost it alongside Goro at the hands of Liu Kang. He is seen in the first pages of issue #1 being pursued and punished by Shao Kahn, Kintaro, and Gorbak (Goro's father). Even though Shao Kahn supposedly punished him, he later appears in the last page of issue #5 completely rejuvenated and still under Shao Kahn's servitude. Shang Tsung would later serve as the leader of Shao Kahn's team during the tournament he prepared in the last issue of the series, Tournament Edition II. Shang Tsung's last appearance is during the 1995 Kung Lao one-shot comic, in which he serves as the antagonist, attempting to kill Kung Lao through deceptive tricks using his shapeshifting abilities.

 Shang Tsung is the antagonist in Mortal Kombat, where he is played by Cary-Hiroyuki Tagawa. He sporadically resorts to intimidation and trickery to manipulate the outcome of the tournament. He is defeated and killed by Liu Kang in the final battle as revenge for killing his brother Chan.

Shang Tsung is also the villain of the animated film Mortal Kombat: The Journey Begins, voiced by Jim Cummings. In this version, he is portrayed as having the ability to read his opponent's thoughts during the battle (an ability that was not present in the game series), allowing him to predict their attacks and adapt his own strategy to exploit the opponent's greatest weakness.

Shang Tsung appeared in several episodes of the animated series Mortal Kombat: Defenders of the Realm, voiced by Neil Ross. In the 2015 Mortal Kombat X prequel comics published by DC Comics, in which he has not appeared, his island is described as having been taken over by Reiko and Havik following his death.

In the Mortal Kombat: Konquest TV series, Shang Tsung was portrayed by Bruce Locke as a sorcerer eager to take revenge on the Great Kung Lao, who had defeated him in Mortal Kombat. For most of the series, he is confined to Shao Kahn's cobalt mines for his failure in the Mortal Kombat tournament, although he occasionally escapes, since his powers are unaffected by the cobalt in the mines due to his human heritage. While in the mines, he keeps Kreeyan princess Vorpax as his personal slave and generally mistreats her until she receives her mother's powers. As with the other characters, Tsung is defeated in the finale by Kahn's Shadow Priests.

Shang Tsung appears briefly in the short film Mortal Kombat: Rebirth, portrayed by James Lew, and in the third episode of the web series Mortal Kombat: Legacy, played by Johnson Phan. Tagawa reprised his role from the first movie for the second season as successfully luring Liu Kang over to Outworld.

Shang Tsung appears in the animated film Mortal Kombat Legends: Scorpion's Revenge and the sequel Mortal Kombat Legends: Battle of the Realms.

Chin Han portrays Shang Tsung in the 2021 reboot film Mortal Kombat.

Reception

Cultural impact 
Shang Tsung was featured along with Raiden, Ermac, Jax, and Scorpion in a 2014 animated short film parodying Mortal Kombat that was produced by Comedy Central and titled "The Tournament of Fighting Styles." He was renamed "Yao Zhang" and was the host of a secret underground tournament that is halted when a match featuring "Iron Shogun" (Scorpion) goes awry after the tournament's other contestants are no-shows, leaving Zhang scrambling to find a replacement. Iron Shogun is eventually declared the tournament winner when he kills a pizza deliveryman who unwittingly enters the arena. Shang Tsung appeared in a 2012 episode of The Annoying Orange, played by Bobby Jennings (Bobjenz).

Critical reaction
The character was met with a positive critical reception. Shang Tsung was ranked 17th on GameDaily's 2009 list of top evil masterminds of all time, which noted his attack style and goals while stating he is "one twisted freak." That same year, GamesRadar listed him as one of the top villains who will never stay dead. He was also sixth on GamesRadar's list of most misunderstood videogame villains. GamesRadar also listed his Fatality where he morphs into Kintaro from Mortal Kombat II as one of "ten greatest things about Mortal Kombat". In 2010, Shang Tsung was ranked 97th in IGN's list of top video game villains, with a comment that "considering Shang Tsung's devious powers and his cruel methods, his status as a reputable villain of the series is well deserved."

He was also ranked as third in Game Revolution's list of top old school Mortal Kombat characters for his ability to morph into other fighters during battles. Game Rant ranked Shang Tsung at number five on their list of "most awesome" Mortal Kombat characters, praising his ability to transform into other characters and adding "despite Shang Tsung’s limited arsenal of unique special attacks, the character still provides experienced players with a stylish way to dispatch opponents." In 2011, GameFront ranked his moustache in MK2011 as the fourth best moustache in video games. In UGO's 2012 list of top Mortal Kombat characters, Shang Tsung placed at 15th. Complex placed this "cold-blooded mastermind" at the top of their lists of the greatest wizards in games in 2012, calling him the "coolest video game wizard ever, by far," and of the most brutal fighters in Mortal Kombat in 2013. In 2013, Complex also included his transformation into Kintaro and his "Soul Purge" in MK3 among the best finishing moves in the series.

References

Action film characters
Action film villains
Fictional martial artists in video games
Fictional Bái Hè Quán practitioners
Fictional Chinese people in video games
Fictional Shé Quán practitioners
Fictional Tang Láng Quán practitioners
Fictional characters with immortality
Fictional murdered people
Fictional jianke
Fictional kidnappers
Fictional mass murderers
Fictional necromancers
Fictional soul collectors
Male characters in video games
Male supervillains
Male film villains
Male video game villains
Mortal Kombat characters
Shapeshifter characters in video games
Video game antagonists
Video game bosses
Video game characters introduced in 1992
Video game characters who use magic
Video game characters with slowed ageing